There are many landmarks in Beijing. The best-known ones include the Badaling stretch of the Great Wall of China, the Temple of Heaven, the Tian'anmen and the Forbidden City, a number of temples, hutongs and parks, relics of ages gone by.

Buildings, monuments and landmarks

Baliqiao (Eight Mile Bridge)
Beijing Ancient Observatory
Beijing National Stadium
Bell Tower and Drum Tower
Forbidden City (World Heritage Site)
Guozijian (Imperial College)
Haotian Pagoda
Historic hutongs and siheyuans in many older neighborhoods
Huguang Guild Hall
Liulichang
Marco Polo Bridge and the Wanping Fortress
Ming tombs (World Heritage Site)
Old Summer Palace
Pagoda of Cishou Temple
Pagoda of Tianning Temple
Peking Man Site at Zhoukoudian (World Heritage Site)
Prince Chun Mansion
Prince Gong Mansion
Summer Palace (World Heritage Site)
Tiananmen Square
Great Hall of the People
Mausoleum of Mao Zedong
Monument to the People's Heroes
National Centre for the Performing Arts
National Museum of China
Tiananmen (Gate of Heavenly Peace)
Zhengyangmen
Tuancheng Fortress
Zhengyici Peking Opera Theatre

Temples, churches and mosques 

Altar of Earth and Harvests
Badachu
Bailin Temple
Big Bell Temple
Cathedral of the Immaculate Conception
Chanfu Temple
Changchun Temple
Cheng'en Temple
Confucius Temple
Dahui Temple
Dajue Temple
Dongyue Temple
Fahai Temple
Fayuan Temple
Guanghua Temple
Guangji Temple
Hongluo Temple
Imperial Ancestral Temple
Jietai Temple
Miaoying Temple
Niujie Mosque
Temple of Azure Clouds
Temple of Earth
Temple of Heaven (World Heritage Site)
Temple of Moon
Temple of the Sun
Xiancantan
Tanzhe Temple
Temple of Agriculture
Wangfujing Church
Wanshou Temple
White Cloud Temple
Wofo Temple
Xishiku Church
Church of Our Lady of Mount Carmel, Beijing
Yonghegong
Yunju Temple
Zhenjue Temple
Zhihua Temple

Museums

Beijing Art Museum
Beijing Exhibition Center
Beijing Liao and Jin City Wall Museum
Beijing Museum of Natural History
Beijing Planning Exhibition Hall
Capital Museum
China Railway Museum
Chinese Aviation Museum
Dabaotai Western Han Dynasty Mausoleum
Geological Museum of China
Military Museum of the Chinese People's Revolution
National Art Museum of China
National Museum of China
Palace Museum
Paleozoological Museum of China
Western Zhou Yan State Capital Museum
Yuan Center

Parks and gardens

Beihai Park
Beijing Botanical Garden
Chaoyang Park
Ditan Park
Fragrant Hills
Grandview Garden
Haidian Park
Honglingjin Park
Jingshan Park
Longtan Park
Milu Yuan
Ming City Wall Relics Park
Olympic Green
Purple Bamboo Park
Qingnianhu Park
Ritan Park
Shichahai
Taoranting Park
Tiantan Park
World Park
Wuzuolou Forest Park
Yuetan Park
Zhongshan Park
Yuyuantan Park

Shopping and commercial districts

798 Art Zone
Beijing central business district
Beijing Financial Street
Silk Street
Wangfujing
Xidan
Yizhuang
Zhongguancun

See also
List of hutongs in Beijing
List of pagodas in Beijing
Major national historical and cultural sites in Beijing
Tourism in China

External links

Travel guide and Beijing 2008 Olympics
Beijing Travel
Photographic guides to 40 tourist attractions
Interactive map of top tourist attractions in Beijing

Landmarks by city
Landmarks in China
Lists of tourist attractions in China
 Landmarks
Lists of landmarks